The 2007 Nigerian Senate election in Bayelsa State was held on April 21, 2007, to elect members of the Nigerian Senate to represent Bayelsa State. Heineken Lokpobiri representing Bayelsa West, Emmanuel Paulker representing Bayelsa Central and Nimi Barigha-Amange representing Bayelsa East all won on the platform of the Peoples Democratic Party.

Overview

Summary

Results

Bayelsa West 
The election was won by Heineken Lokpobiri of the Peoples Democratic Party.

Bayelsa Central 
The election was won by Emmanuel Paulker of the Peoples Democratic Party.

Bayelsa East 
The election was won by Nimi Barigha-Amange of the Peoples Democratic Party.

References 

Senate
Bayelsa
Bayelsa State Senate elections